The Pleasure Garden is a short film written and directed by James Broughton in 1953. Among its crew was Peter Price as sound editor. Cast members included the subsequent director Lindsay Anderson and Broughton's artistic collaborator Kermit Sheets.

Plot 
Filmed among the ruins of the Crystal Palace Terraces, The Pleasure Garden is a poetic ode to desire, and winner of the Prix de Fantasie Poetique at Cannes in 1954. Made by the American poet James Broughton, the film features Hattie Jacques and Lindsay Anderson, with John Le Mesurier as the bureaucrat determined to stamp out any form of free expression.

Cast 
 Hattie Jacques as Mrs Albion
 Diana Maddox as Bess
 Kermit Sheets as Sam
 Jean Anderson as Aunt Minerva
 John Le Mesurier as Colonel Pall K. Gargoyle
 Maxine Audley as Lady Ennui
 Derek Hart as Lord Ennui
 Jill Bennett as Miss Kellerman
 Lindsay Anderson as Michael-Angelico
 John Heawood as Mr Nurmi
 Hilary Mackendrick as Miss Wheeling
 Gladys Spencer as Mrs Jennybelle
 Gontron Goulden as Doctor Hemingway
 Victoria Grayson as Miss Greaves
 Mary Lee Settle as Mme Paganini
 Daphne Hunter as Girl in Grass

DVD release 
The Pleasure Garden was released on DVD in the UK by the BFI on 15 February 2010. The release also includes The Phoenix Tower (UK, 1957, 39 min.), a short documentary charting the construction of the BBC's Crystal Palace Television Tower, plus a fully illustrated booklet with film notes, an original review and a history of the Crystal Palace.

See also 
 List of avant-garde films of the 1950s

References

External links 
 
 

1953 films
American short films
American avant-garde and experimental films
1950s American films